Danni Katherin Pedraza Avendaño (born 30 July 1994), known as Danny Pedraza, is a Bolivian footballer who plays as a defender for the Bolivia women's national team.

Early life
Pedraza hails from the Santa Cruz Department.

International career
Pedraza represented Bolivia at the 2014 South American U-20 Women's Championship. At senior level, she played the 2018 Copa América Femenina.

References

1994 births
Living people
Women's association football defenders
Bolivian women's footballers
People from Santa Cruz Department (Bolivia)
Bolivia women's international footballers